Germarostes is a genus of pill scarab beetles in the family Hybosoridae. There are at least 70 described species in Germarostes.

Species
These 72 species belong to the genus Germarostes:

 Germarostes abruptus (Petrovitz, 1973) c g
 Germarostes allorgei (Paulian, 1947) c g
 Germarostes anchicayae Paulian, 1982 c g
 Germarostes antiquus (Erichson, 1843) c g
 Germarostes aphodioides (Illiger, 1800) i c g b
 Germarostes argentinus (Ohaus, 1911) c g
 Germarostes batesi (Harold, 1874) c g
 Germarostes bidens (Bates, 1887) c g
 Germarostes brunnipes (Germar, 1843) c g
 Germarostes bugabensis (Arrow, 1903) c g
 Germarostes carinatus (Paulian, 1982) c
 Germarostes carltoni Howden & Gill, 2005 c g
 Germarostes columbianus Paulian, 1982 c g
 Germarostes costulatus Paulian, 1982 c g
 Germarostes crassicollis (Arrow, 1903) c
 Germarostes degallieri Paulian, 1982 c g
 Germarostes diffundus (Petrovitz, 1976) c g
 Germarostes ecuadoricus Paulian, 1982 c g
 Germarostes ecuadoriensis (Petrovitz, 1976) c g
 Germarostes emarginatus (Poinar, 2014) c g
 Germarostes excisus (Bates, 1887) c g
 Germarostes farri (Howden, 1970) c g
 Germarostes gaujoni Paulian, 1982 c g
 Germarostes geayi Paulian, 1982 c g
 Germarostes globosus (Say, 1835) i c g b
 Germarostes guyanensis Paulian, 1982 c g
 Germarostes hamiger (Ohaus, 1911) c g
 Germarostes haroldi (Arrow, 1911) c g
 Germarostes heterodynamus Paulian, 1982 c g
 Germarostes howdenicus Paulian, 1982 c g
 Germarostes indigaceus (Germar, 1843) c g
 Germarostes infantulus (Bates, 1887) c g
 Germarostes instriatus Paulian, 1982 c g
 Germarostes jamaicensis (Howden, 1978) c g
 Germarostes leprieuri (Germar, 1843) c g
 Germarostes leticiae Paulian, 1982 c g
 Germarostes macleayi (Perty, 1830) c g
 Germarostes madeiranus Paulian, 1982 c g
 Germarostes malkini Paulian, 1982 c g
 Germarostes metallicus (Harold, 1874) c g
 Germarostes nasutus (Bates, 1887) c g
 Germarostes nigerrimus (Blanchard, 1846) c g
 Germarostes nitens (Guérin-Méneville, 1839) c g
 Germarostes oberthuri Paulian, 1982 c g
 Germarostes osellai Ballerio & Gill, 2008 c g
 Germarostes otonga Ballerio & Gill, 2008 c g
 Germarostes pauliani (Chalumeau & Cambefort, 1976) c g
 Germarostes pecki (Howden, 1970) c g
 Germarostes plicatus (Germar, 1843) c g
 Germarostes posticus (Germar, 1843) c g
 Germarostes pullus Paulian, 1982 c g
 Germarostes puncticollis (Erichson, 1843) c g
 Germarostes punctulatus (Ohaus, 1911) c g
 Germarostes pusillus (Castelnau, 1840) c g
 Germarostes pustulosus (Lansberge, 1887) c g
 Germarostes reticularis (Bates, 1887) c g
 Germarostes rotundatus Paulian, 1982 c g
 Germarostes rufopiceus (Arrow, 1903) c g
 Germarostes rugatus (Germar, 1843) c g
 Germarostes rugiceps (Germar, 1843) c g
 Germarostes salesiacus Paulian, 1982 c g
 Germarostes semituberculatus (Germar, 1843) c g
 Germarostes senegalensis (Castelnau, 1840) c
 Germarostes sinuatus (Bates, 1887) c g
 Germarostes sticticus (Erichson, 1843) c g
 Germarostes strigilateris (Bates, 1887) c g
 Germarostes sulcipennis (Harold, 1875) c g
 Germarostes tibialis (Petrovitz, 1973) c g
 Germarostes tubericauda (Bates, 1891) c g
 Germarostes viridipennis (Bates, 1887) c g
 Germarostes viridis (Lansberge, 1887) c g
 Germarostes viridulus (Bates, 1887) c g

Data sources: i = ITIS, c = Catalogue of Life, g = GBIF, b = Bugguide.net

References

Further reading

 
 
 
 
 
 

Beetles
Articles created by Qbugbot